Václav Havel Prize for Creative Dissent is an award established in 2012 by the New York City-based Human Rights Foundation (HRF). According to HRF President Thor Halvorssen, the prize recognizes individuals "who engage in creative dissent, exhibiting courage and creativity to challenge injustice and live in truth".

Named in honor of Czech dissident playwright and politician Václav Havel, who died in December 2011, the award was founded with the help of his widow, Dagmar Havlová.  Google co-founder Sergei Brin and PayPal co-founder Peter Thiel provided part of the prize's funding.

Recipients

See also

 Václav Havel Award for Human Rights

References

Awards established in 2012
Free expression awards